Dellichthys trnskii, is a clingfish, the second species in the genus Dellichthys, recently discovered from intertidal and shallow coastal waters of New Zealand. Its length is between 11.9–46.0  mm.

Snout broad and short. upper and lower jaws equal in length. Snout tip and lower jaw pale pink. Dorsal and lateral surface of head are light yellow to green. Body pale orange to yellow. Median fins transparent. Head large, slightly dorsoventrally compressed. Body width tapering gradually posteriorly. Anterior nostril a small tubular opening, whereas posterior nostril tubular. Mouth terminal and small. Pharyngeal jaws comprising patch of 16–18 small conical teeth. 10–12 gill rakers present. Nine rays in dorsal fin. Seven rays in anal fin. All fin rays unbranched and segmented. Caudal fin rounded. Adhesive disc large.

Etymology
This species is named in honour of Tom Trnski, the Head of Natural Sciences at the Auckland War Memorial Museum.

References

trnskii
Endemic marine fish of New Zealand
Taxa named by Kevin W. Conway
Taxa named by Andrew L. Stewart 
Taxa named by Adam P. Summers
Fish described in 2018